The Temple of the Jade Mountain (chữ Nôm: 𪽛玉山) is located on the Jade Islet in Hoàn Kiếm Lake, central Hanoi, Vietnam.

History 
Being built on the Jade Islet and dedicated to Confucian and Taoist philosophers and the national hero, Trần Hưng Đạo, the small temple was expanded in 1865.

From the shore, Thê Húc Bridge (Cầu Thê Húc) leads to the islet. Buildings of the temple include the Pen Tower (Tháp Bút), the ink-slab (Đài Nghiên), the Moon Contemplation Pavilion (Đắc Nguyệt) and the Pavilion against Waves (Đình Trấn Ba), all of which have symbolic meaning.

Gallery

External links

Taoist temples in Hanoi